"Bad Bitch" (edited as "Bad B*tch") is a song by hip hop recording artist French Montana, featuring vocals from American R&B singer Jeremih. It was released on December 15, 2014, as a standalone single.

Music video
The music video for "Bad Bitch" was directed by Eif Rivera and released on February 23, 2015. It features cameo appearances by Travi$ Scott, Lil Durk and DJ Khaled.

Remix
The official remix features French Montana and Jeremih along with additional rap verses from Rick Ross and Fabolous.

Track listing
 Digital single

Charts

References

2014 songs
2014 singles
French Montana songs
Jeremih songs
Bad Boy Records singles
Interscope Records singles
Songs written by Jeremih
Songs written by French Montana